Anti Avsan (born 1958) is a Swedish politician of the Moderate Party. He was member of the Riksdag from 2006 to 2018.

Avsan is a former policeman. Due to his political engagements he is on leave from his current job as a judge in Stockholm.

References

Members of the Riksdag from the Moderate Party
Living people
1958 births
Members of the Riksdag 2006–2010
Members of the Riksdag 2010–2014
Members of the Riksdag 2014–2018
21st-century Swedish politicians